High Finance is a quiz show created and hosted by Dennis James which aired on CBS from July 7 to December 15, 1956. It followed Gunsmoke on the CBS schedule. High Finance aired at 10:30 p.m. Saturdays opposite NBC's Your Hit Parade.

On the program, contestants answered questions about current events. The player would be asked five questions based on three newspapers which he or she studied before the show. Each correct answer earned $300. Three correct answers allowed the player to play the "investment segment" in which he or she wagered any amount of the money won on answering a question. A correct answer won the wager and a prize, plus the option to risk any prizes won and return the next week to play another "investment segment" or keep any prizes won and leave the show. A fourth win would earn that player his or her "dream prize", such as a miniature golf course or a restaurant. A fifth successful "investment segment" won that player an additional $75,000.

References

External link
High Finance on IMDb

1956 American television series debuts
1956 American television series endings
1950s American game shows
Black-and-white American television shows
CBS original programming
Television game shows with incorrect disambiguation